Carey & Hart was an American publishing company founded in Philadelphia, Pennsylvania in 1829 by Edward L. Carey and Abraham Hart.

History 
In early November 1829, Edward Carey withdrew his partnership from his brother's company, Carey, Lea, & Carey, to form Carey & Hart alongside Abraham Hart. The duo took over the retail book business of Edward's former company and remained in the same building alongside Carey, Lea, & Carey, now renamed Carey & Lea. The companies were located on the southeast corner of Fourth and Chestnut Streets.

The company remained successful for twenty-five years, although Carey and Hart's partnership saw its end following Edward Carey's death on June 16, 1845. The establishment continued under the name Carey & Hart until September 1849. Hart's business throve until his retirement in 1854, which marked the end of Carey & Hart publishing company.

References

External links 
 Select Books Published by Carey & Hart at Internet Archive

Publishing companies of the United States
Companies based in Philadelphia
Publishing companies established in 1829
19th century in Philadelphia